Baloncesto Superior Nacional Scoring Champion are the season by season points leaders of the top-tier level professional basketball league in Puerto Rico, the BSN. It was inaugurated during the 1956–57 season.

Characteristics
In basketball, points are accumulated through free throws or field goals.

Since the 1969–70 season, the BSN's scoring champion is awarded to the player with the highest points per game average in a given regular season. Prior to the 1969–70 season, the league's leader in points was the player that scored the most total points in the league during the season. 

To qualify for a scoring champion, a player must play in at least 75 percent of the total games played during that season.

Points Leader by season

By Total Points scored

By Points average

Multiple-time leaders

References

External links 
 BSN Official Website 

Baloncesto Superior Nacional
Basketball leagues in Puerto Rico